Leon Schneider (born 19 June 2000) is a German professional footballer who plays as a midfielder for Regionalliga West club 1. FC Köln II.

Career
Schneider made his professional debut for Energie Cottbus in the 3. Liga on 10 October 2018, coming on as a substitute in the 79th minute for Paul Gehrmann in the 1–2 home loss against Hallescher FC. On 26 July 2020, Schneider joined KFC Uerdingen 05 on a one-year loan deal.

Honours
Energie Cottbus
 Brandenburg Cup: 2017–18, 2018–19

References

External links
 
 Profile at kicker.de
 Profile at fcenergie-museum.de
 

2000 births
Living people
Sportspeople from Eisenhüttenstadt
Footballers from Brandenburg
German footballers
Association football midfielders
FC Energie Cottbus players
1. FC Köln II players
KFC Uerdingen 05 players
Würzburger Kickers players
3. Liga players
Regionalliga players